Brindabella is a locality in south-east New South Wales, Australia, mainly in the area of Snowy Valleys Council and partly in Yass Valley Council. It is reached by the Brindabella Road from the Australian Capital Territory over the Brindabella Ranges. It is significant as the early home of Miles Franklin, who wrote a well known book called Childhood at Brindabella. The locality also includes a large unpopulated area consisting of parts of the Brindabella National Park, the Kosciuszko National Park and the Bimberi Nature Reserve and of state forests.

The Goodradigbee River flows north through the valley. A major farm in the valley is Brindabella Station.

History
The place was named by Indigenous Australians as Brindabella, meaning "two kangaroo rats". The area was considered as an outstation of Yarralumla station. Joseph Franklin and his family settled in the Brindabella Valley in 1861 and Thomas Franklin built the first homestead.

References

Localities in New South Wales
Snowy Valleys Council
Yass Valley Council